The 2011 Southern Illinois Salukis football team represented Southern Illinois University Carbondale as a member of the Missouri Valley Football Conference (MVFC) during the 2011 NCAA Division I FCS football season. Led by fourth-year head coach Dale Lennon, the Salukis compiled an overall record of 4–7 with a mark of 2–6 in conference play, tying for seventh place in the MVFC. Southern Illinois played home games at Saluki Stadium in Carbondale, Illinois.

Schedule

References

Southern Illinois
Southern Illinois Salukis football seasons
Southern Illinois Salukis football